Weronika Anna Rosati (born 9 January 1984) is a Polish actress. She made her acting debut in 2000, and first gained recognition playing Ania in the Polish soap opera M jak miłość (2002–2005, 2018–2020). She appeared in several other Polish television series, before acquiring her first feature film role in Patryk Vega's 2005 action drama Pitbull, which went on to become a cult film in Poland. Her most critically acclaimed films include Obława (2012), which earned her a Polish Film Award nomination for Best Actress, and Never Gonna Snow Again (2020).

Rosati launched her international career with a small uncredited role in David Lynch's 2006 film Inland Empire. She has since played numerous minor roles in English-language films including The Iceman (2012), Bullet to the Head (2012), and USS Indianapolis: Men of Courage (2016), and made guest appearances on television. She had a recurring role on the HBO original television series Luck in 2012. In her native country, she has starred in the films Obce ciało (2014) and Porady na zdrady (2017), and in television in Majka (2009–2010), Czas honoru (2010), Hotel 52 (2013), Strażacy (2015–2016) and Zawsze warto (2019–2020). Aside from acting, Rosati is an active advocate for domestic abuse victims.

Life and career

Early life and education
Weronika Anna Rosati was born on 9 January 1984 in Warsaw, to Polish-Italian father Dariusz Rosati, a professor of economics and former member of the European Parliament, and his wife Teresa, a Polish fashion designer. She has an older brother named Marcin, who is 12 years her senior. When she was two, she moved with her family to Princeton, New Jersey, where her father worked as a lecturer, and when she was six, they relocated to Switzerland for five years, before returning to Poland. Having spent much of her childhood abroad, she is fluent in English and French. Upon being confirmed, she took Dolores as her confirmation name.

As a teenager, Rosati attended a theatre club at the Warsaw Ochota Theatre and trained in dancing and acrobatics at the Warsaw Studio Buffo Theatre. She also studied at the Halina and Jan Machulski Private Acting School in Warsaw. In 2003, she started an acting degree at the National Film School in Łódź, but after one and a half years, she suspended her studies due to M jak miłość filming commitments, and never returned. At 21, she moved to New York, where she studied at various acting schools, including the Stella Adler Academy of Acting and Theatres, the Larry Moss Studio, and the Ivana Chubbuck Studio, and graduated from the Lee Strasberg Theatre and Film Institute.

Acting career

Rosati made her acting debut in 2000 as "Niki" in the Polish television series Klasa na obcasach, which she followed with numerous guest appearances in other Polish television productions. She first gained recognition in 2002, playing Ania in the Polish soap opera M jak miłość (L for Love). She left the series in 2005, before returning in 2018 and leaving again in 2020. Her cinematic debut came in Patryk Vega's 2005 Polish action drama Pitbull, which was a critical success and has become a cult film. For her portrayal of Gemma, the main character's (Marcin Dorociński) love interest, Rosati received two Golden Duck Award nominations. She reprised the role in the film's television adaptation between 2005 and 2008.

Rosati launched her international career with a small uncredited role in David Lynch's 2006 film Inland Empire, followed by an appearance as Mrs. Lawdale in the 2008 horror film House, which was panned by critics, receiving an approval rating of 0% on the review aggregator Rotten Tomatoes. In 2009, she joined the main cast of the Polish adaptation of the Venezuelan soap opera Jane the Virgin titled Majka, in which she played Dagmara between 2009 and 2010. In 2010, she portrayed Rojza, one of the girls working at a fur workshop in Warsaw Ghetto who are terrorised by Nazi guard "Mongoł", in season three of the Polish World War II television drama series Czas honoru (Days of Honour). She starred as a serial-killer Magdalena in the France 2 2011 television thriller film Dame de pique (Dame of Spades), an adaptation of Alexis Lecaye's novel of the same name, which was reviewed well by the French newspaper Le Monde. She also played a journalist named Anna in the 2011 action thriller Largo Winch II, and made a cameo appearance in Agnieszka Holland's Academy Award-nominated 2011 period drama In Darkness. In 2012, Rosati was cast in the recurring role of a poker dealer Naomi in the HBO original television series Luck, and starred as "Pestka", a girl trying to save her younger sister from death, in Obława (Manhunt), a Polish war thriller directed by Marcin Krzyształowicz. The latter earned Rosati critical praise, and a nomination for the Polish Academy Award for Best Actress. Rosati also began making more appearances in American films that year. She played Livi in the biopic The Iceman, Irena in the crime comedy Stand Up Guys, and Lola in the action film Bullet to the Head.

In 2013, she appeared as Jolene in the dance film Battle of the Year, and as a waitress at a nightclub named Veronica in the blockbuster Last Vegas. She also made a guest appearance as Rivka David, Ziva David's (Cote de Pablo) mother, in the episode of the American action police procedural television series NCIS titled "Berlin". In her native country, she voiced Dottie in the Polish-language version of the animated film Planes, a role she reprised in its 2014 sequel, and joined the main cast of season seven of the television series Hotel 52 portraying Maria Jordan. That May, she was honoured with the Pola Negri award "Politka", which recognises Polish actors who achieved international success. In 2014, she made a cameo appearance as a girl at a nightclub named Ginger in the HBO miniseries Rosemary's Baby, and took on another voice role as Ilona in the Polish-language version of the animated film The Nut Job. She also starred as Mira, Kris' (Agnieszka Grochowska) assistant, in Krzysztof Zanussi's psychological drama Obce ciało (Foreign Body). The film premiered at the 2014 Toronto International Film Festival to mixed reviews. Rosati and Grochowska were nominated for the Polish Snake Award for Worst On-Screen Duet.

In 2015, Rosati was cast in the role of Kamila in the TVP1 original television series Strażacy (Firefighters), and made an appearance as prostitute Agnes in season two of the HBO anthology crime drama television series True Detective. The following year, she guest-starred as French agent Delphine Seydoux in an episode of season 11 of the American dark fantasy television series Supernatural, and played Russian man-eater Oksana in a "two-show arc" of season one of the TBS comedy series The Detour. Collider described her performance in the former as "positively dazzling". She also appeared opposite Nicolas Cage as his character's wife Louise McVay in Mario Van Peebles' 2016 war disaster film USS Indianapolis: Men of Courage, and voiced Princess Shallia in the Polish-language version of the comedy film The New Adventures of Aladdin. In 2017, Rosati starred in the Polish romantic comedy film Porady na zdrady for which she received her second Polish Snake Award nomination, this time for Worst Actress. She then joined the cast of the Polish television medical drama Diagnosis in the recurring role of Beata. In the period drama I'll Find You, set in the 1930s and 1940s Poland, directed by Martha Coolidge, she played Ms. Huber, the wife of General Huber (Stephen Dorff). The film premiered at the 2019 Taormina Film Fest. In 2019, Rosati began portraying Marta, one of three lead roles, in the Polish television series Zawsze warto, which spanned two seasons between 2019 and 2020.

Rosati starred in the 2020 drama Never Gonna Snow Again directed by Małgorzata Szumowska and Michał Englert, which premiered in the Main competition of the 77th Venice International Film Festival to critical acclaim. She lent her likeness to Marianne in the 2021 psychological horror video game The Medium, for which she was fully motion-captured. Rosati also appeared as Vanya in season 12 of NCIS: Los Angeles that year.

Personal life and non-acting work
In 2005, Rosati was in a relationship with Polish-American journalist Max Kolonko. In 2010, Polish director Andrzej Żuławski, whom she dated between 2007 and 2008, released a book titled Nocnik, which included a character allegedly based on Rosati named Esther. She sued Żuławski and the book's publisher for violating her right to privacy and dignity as a woman as the book included intimate details about her. She won the case in 2015. In September 2013, Rosati was a passenger in a car driven by her then-partner, Polish actor Piotr Adamczyk, which was involved in a road accident. Due to a leg injury sustained in the accident, she was unable to walk and required several surgeries and continual long-term physiotherapy, which prevented her from working for several months. Rosati and Adamczyk broke up in 2015. She was engaged to Polish orthopedic surgeon Robert Śmigielski with whom she was in a relationship between 2016 and 2018. She gave birth to their daughter, Elizabeth Valentina, on 11 December 2017. As of 2020, Rosati splits her time between homes in Warsaw and Los Angeles.

While in a relationship with Śmigielski, Rosati experienced domestic abuse. She later became an advocate for domestic abuse victims. In 2019, she founded the Siła Kobiety Foundation (Woman's Strength Foundation), which offers help and support to women affected by domestic abuse. She has been credited with influencing the Me Too movement in Poland, and was honoured with the Polish Glamour Woman of the Year award for Activism.

Rosati was included on the annual list of the 100 most valuable stars of the Polish show business compiled by the Polish edition of Forbes magazine between 2012 and 2014. She ranked 84th, 85th, and 83rd, respectively. She was the Polish ambassador of Procter and Gamble hair products Pantene (2004), Dr Irena Eris skin care line and fragrance Sin Skin (2007–2008), and Avon Products fragrance Femme (2014). She participated in season 10 of Taniec z gwiazdami (Polish version of Dancing with the Stars) in 2009, and was also a guest judge alongside her mother on the second season of Project Runway Poland in 2015 and guest-hosted SNL Poland in 2018. Rosati has also written articles about Hollywood stars and cinema for the website Stopklatka.pl and the magazine Film, among others. In 2021, she launched a vegan skin care brand Lajuu.

Filmography

Film

Television

Video games

Notes

References

External links

 
 

1984 births
Living people
Actresses from Warsaw
Lee Strasberg Theatre and Film Institute alumni
Polish film actresses
Polish soap opera actresses
Polish television actresses
Polish video game actresses
Polish voice actresses
21st-century Polish actresses
Polish emigrants to the United States
Polish people of Italian descent